XHDE-TDT is a television station in San Luis Potosí, San Luis Potosí. XHDE broadcasts on virtual channel 13 (physical channel 16).

Last an independent station, XHDE has been off the air since November 2020, when unionized station employees voted to go on strike due to lack of payment.

History
XHDE began broadcasting on November 1, 1975, making it the first truly local television station in San Luis Potosí. (A repeater of the XEW network had previously been in operation.)

XHDE maintained a partnership with Televisa and carried programming from FOROtv, resulting in the station being defined as within the "preponderant economic agent" in broadcasting for regulatory purposes; 80 percent of its programming in 2014 was sourced from the company. Televisa programming was removed from XHDE in 2018 after the company multiplexed FOROtv on its own transmitter in San Luis Potosí.

On November 12, 2020, a strike began as unionized employees blocked access to the station. Employees had not been paid since January. The station had been in poor financial condition since the disaffiliation from Televisa.

Programming
XHDE aired local CN13 newscasts, as well as other locally produced programming.

References

Television stations in San Luis Potosí
Television channels and stations established in 1975
1975 establishments in Mexico